Nikitin Pochinok is a rural locality (a village) in Moseyevskoye Rural Settlement, Totemsky District, Vologda Oblast, Russia. The population was 18 as of 2002.

Geography 
Nikitin Pochinok is located 58 km northwest of Totma (the district's administrative centre) by road. Danilov Pochinok is the nearest rural locality.

References 

Rural localities in Tarnogsky District